Herman Harry Rijkaard (12 September 1935 – 30 September 2010) was a Surinamese footballer who played as a forward for S.V. Robinhood in the SVB Hoofdklasse, F.C. Blauw-Wit in the Dutch Eredivisie, and for IJ.V.V. Stormvogels in the Eerste Divisie.

He is the father of former Dutch international player and Barcelona manager Frank Rijkaard.

Career

Early career
Born in Surinam, Rijkaard began his football career on the Mr. Bronsplein sport terrein in Paramaribo, before he was picked up by one of the local clubs, joining the youth ranks of V.V. Ajax playing with the likes of Erwin Sparendam and Charley Marbach, before being recruited to the ranks of S.V. Robinhood.

SV Robinhood
Having played in the youth ranks of S.V. Robinhood, Rijkaard progressed to the Surinamese Hoofdklasse. As an attacker with a strong right foot, he helped Robinhood to national titles in 1955 and 1956. While making a living as a bookkeeper for a company called Kersten & Co., word started spreading in Suriname about a fully professional league being established in the Netherlands. Rijkaard soon relocated, joining FC Blauw-Wit from Amsterdam, the crosstown rivals of AFC Ajax at the time.

FC Blauw-Wit
In 1957, Rijkaard joined FC Blauw-Wit playing in the Olympic Stadium in the newly formed Eredivisie, the top flight of professional football in the Netherlands.  He would be reunited with his childhood friend Sparendam once more. Due to his strong physique, Rijkaard was gradually moved to a more defensive role on the playing pitch. A development his Son would undergo during his playing career as well. A 13th-place finish with Blauw-Wit in the league table was his best result in four seasons with the club, before transferring to IJ.V.V. Stormvogels from nearby Velsen.

IJVV Stormvogels
In 1961 he joined the IJ.V.V. Stormvogels, competing in the Dutch Eerste Divisie, the 2nd tier of professional football in the Netherlands. He played for one season before directing his focus towards family and the needs of Surinamese expatriates in the Netherlands, thus retiring from professional football as a player.

Personal life and other work
After his career as a football player, Rijkaard took a job as a social worker in Amsterdam. He married Neel van der Meulen and in 1959 they had their first son Herman Harry Rijkaard Jr. Three years later Franklin Edmundo Rijkaard was born. Frank is one of the most successful players/managers in the history of Dutch football.

As a social worker, Rijkaard was intimately involved in the integration process of his compatriots who were emigrating to the Netherlands escaping political unrest in Suriname. He was the manager of Real Sranang, an amateur football club in the Netherlands for a while, and was also the secretary of the ROVI (Reünisten Oud Surinaamse Voetbalinternationals), an organization based in the Netherlands responsible for organizing reunion matches and events for former players of the Suriname national team living in the Netherlands. He died on 30 September 2010 of unspecified causes.

Honours

Club
S.V. Robinhood
 Hoofdklasse (2): 1955, 1956

References 

1935 births
2010 deaths
Sportspeople from Paramaribo
Surinamese footballers
S.V. Robinhood players
Blauw-Wit Amsterdam players
Eredivisie players
Eerste Divisie players
SVB Eerste Divisie players
Surinamese expatriate footballers
Expatriate footballers in the Netherlands
Surinamese emigrants to the Netherlands
Association football forwards